Puerto de Vega is one of eight parishes (administrative divisions) in Navia, a municipality within the province and autonomous community of Asturias, in northern Spain.

In 1995, Puerto de Vega won the Prince of Asturias Award to the Exemplary Town of Asturias.

Villages
 Puerto de Vega
 Santa Marina
 Soirana
 Vega
 Cima y Vigo

Notable people
Álvaro de Navia Osorio y Vigil, Marqués de Santa Cruz de Marcenado
Gaspar Melchor de Jovellanos, statesman and poet (1744–1811), died here

Parishes in Navia